Kasamiro Kashri Marchlo (born 1948) is a Sudanese boxer. He competed in the men's lightweight event at the 1972 Summer Olympics.

References

1948 births
Living people
Sudanese male boxers
Olympic boxers of Sudan
Boxers at the 1972 Summer Olympics
Place of birth missing (living people)
Lightweight boxers